Billy Balmer (29 July 1875 – February 1961) was an English footballer who played for Everton, as well as the English national side. His brother Bob played alongside him for Everton and his nephew was Jack Balmer.

Career
Balmer was a tough-tackling full-back. He joined Everton in 1897 from South Shore and went on to play 331 games, scoring one goal. His brother Bob – four years his junior – also played for Everton. His nephew, Jack, attained fame with local rivals Liverpool.

His only England appearance came in a 1–1 draw with Ireland in 1905.

Balmer spent the 1909–10 and 1910–11 seasons in the Southern League with Croydon Common, making 64 appearances and scoring four goals. In 1912, 35-year-old Balmer joined Chester in the Lancashire Combination, but he left after just two games as he was deemed to be too slow and past his best.

In 1921, Balmer was appointed as trainer at Huddersfield Town and progressed to become a coach with the club.

References

External links

1875 births
1961 deaths
English footballers
England international footballers
Everton F.C. players
Chester City F.C. players
English Football League players
Croydon Common F.C. players
Footballers from Liverpool
Association football fullbacks
English Football League representative players
Southern Football League players
Huddersfield Town A.F.C. non-playing staff
People from West Derby
FA Cup Final players